The Mongol-Okhotsk Ocean also known as the Khangai-Khantey Ocean was an ancient ocean, present during the Mesozoic. Oceanic rocks from the ancient ocean floor are preserved in the Mongol-Okhotsk suture zone extending through Mongolia to the Sea of Okhotsk.

Sequence of events 
With the formation of the supercontinent Pangea in the mid- to late-Paleozoic, the vast Panthalassa ocean dominated 70 percent of the Earth's surface. The Tethys, Mongol-Okhotsk and various small domains of early Pacific ocean crust constituted other small oceans. Paleomagnetic data collected between 1987 and 2010 suggest that the Mongol-Okhotsk oceanic crust subducted under the terranes of Mongolia in the Late Jurassic or Early Cretaceous.

During the early Mesozoic, the Solonker Ocean, also known as the Intra-Asian Ocean closed bringing together two large continental blocks: Amuria and the North China Block. Amuria then collided with the Siberian Craton, preserving the Mongol-Okhotsk suture zone. Geologists debate why the suture zone ends abruptly near Kazakhstan and have used seismic tomography to develop different interpretations.

Rock formations of the Mongol-Okhotsk suture zone 
Most exposed rocks in the suture zone are thrusted accretionary wedges, often with ophiolites. Uranium-lead dating of basalt, dolerite gabbro as well as Silurian radiolarite gives ages constraints on the formation of the oceanic crust. Dated rocks in the Adaatsag ophiolite in the east are among the oldest at 325 million years old.

See also 

 List of ancient oceans

References 

Historical oceans
Geology of Russia
Geology of Mongolia